The 2007 SEC Championship Game was played on December 1, 2007 in the Georgia Dome in Atlanta, Georgia.  The game determined the 2007 football champion of the Southeastern Conference.  The LSU Tigers, winners of the Western division of the SEC, defeated the Tennessee Volunteers, who won the Eastern division, by a score of 21–14.  This was the second time the two teams have met in the conference championship game.

Selection process

The SEC Championship Game matches up the winner of the Eastern and Western divisions of the Southeastern Conference.  The game was first played in 1992, when the conference expanded from 10 to 12 teams with the addition of Arkansas and South Carolina.  The SEC was the first conference in college football to have a conference championship game.

Regular season
LSU was ranked as high as #1 in the country and was a favorite to play in the national title game, however those dreams were thought to have been shattered when the Tigers lost to unranked Arkansas in 3 overtime periods at home on the final game of the regular season.  LSU finished the regular season with a 10–2 record.  They were 6–2 in the SEC and won the SEC Western Division outright.

Tennessee began the season with a highly anticipated out-of-conference matchup with California in Berkeley.  The 15th ranked Vols lost to the 12th ranked Golden Bears, 45–31.  Tennessee slipped in the polls, eventually losing twice more to Florida and Alabama, however, they finished the season strong, winning their last five games.  In the final game of the regular season, the Volunteers needed to beat Kentucky in order to secure a berth in the SEC Championship Game.  If Kentucky won, then Georgia would be the representative from the Eastern division.  The game was an exciting one as it went into 4 overtime periods.  The Volunteers eventually won it by sacking Kentucky QB Andre Woodson during a 2-point conversion attempt.  Tennessee finished the regular season with a 9–3 overall record and a 6–2 record in the SEC Eastern division.  They tied with Georgia as champions of the SEC East, however, by virtue of a head-to-head victory over Georgia, the Volunteers were the SEC East representatives in the championship game.

Pre-Game
Prior to the game, LSU was faced with many distractions.  On Friday, November 30, news sources leaked that Nebraska had hired defensive coordinator Bo Pelini to be their new head coach.  On the morning of game day, ESPN reported that LSU head coach Les Miles would be announced as the new head coach of Michigan.  Later on that day, Les Miles called a press conference to announce that he was would not be leaving LSU to coach Michigan.  Also on the minds of the Tigers, quarterback Matt Flynn would not start due to an injury.  Instead, Ryan Perrilloux would get the start.

Game summary
LSU won the game by a score of 21–14, after Erik Ainge threw two interceptions in the 4th quarter.

References

External links
2007 SEC Championship Game at SECSports.com

SEC Championship
SEC Championship Game
LSU Tigers football games
Tennessee Volunteers football games
December 2007 sports events in the United States
2007 in sports in Georgia (U.S. state)
2007 in Atlanta